Thomas Parker Host Sr. (1892–1963) was the mayor of Newport News, Virginia from September 3, 1940 to February 13, 1942. Prior to serving as mayor, he was the founder and owner of T. Parker Host, Inc., a maritime management company that served as an agent for liner services transporting goods through the ports of Hampton Roads. This company is now run by his son, T. Parker Host Jr., and grandsons Tom and David.

References 

 History(on T. Parker Host, Inc. website)

Mayors of Newport News, Virginia
Virginia city council members
1892 births
1963 deaths
20th-century American politicians